Trowbridge is a surname. Notable people with the surname include:

Alexander Buel Trowbridge (1929–2006), U.S. Secretary of Commerce under President Lyndon Johnson
Augustus Trowbridge (1870–1934), American physicist and professor
Bill Trowbridge (1930–2019), British physicist and engineer
Bob Trowbridge (1930–1980), professional baseball player
Charles Trowbridge (1882–1967), American film actor
Charles Christopher Trowbridge (1800–1883), explorer, politician, businessman, and ethnographer of Native American cultures who lived in Detroit
Charles T. Trowbridge (1835–1907), American politician
Edmund Trowbridge (1709–1793), judge during the Boston Massacre trial. 
Elton Trowbridge (1904–1974), member of the Wyoming House of Representatives from 1961 until his death
Glenn E. Trowbridge (born 1943), American politician.
John Trowbridge (physicist) (1843–1923), American physicist
John Todd Trowbridge (1780–1858), member of the Wisconsin Territorial Legislature
John Townsend Trowbridge (1827–1916), popular American author
Josiah Trowbridge (1785–1862), American politician from Buffalo, New York 
Peter Trowbridge, American landscape architect 
Rear Admiral Sir Richard Trowbridge (1920–2003), KCVO, Governor of Western Australia from 1980 to 1983
Rowland E. Trowbridge (1821–1881), U.S. Representative from Michigan
Samuel Beck Parkman Trowbridge (1862–1925), partner in Trowbridge & Livingston architectural practice
Stephen V. R. Trowbridge (Michigan Attorney General) (1855–1891), American lawyer and politician
Stephen V. R. Trowbridge (Michigan legislator) (1794–1859), American politician
Thomas E. Trowbridge (1930–2009), member of both houses of the Wyoming State Legislature
William Petit Trowbridge (1828–1892), civil engineer who built Trowbridge House in 1859

English toponymic surnames